Fujiwara no Hideyoshi (藤原秀能 1184 - 1240) was a Heian period waka poet and Japanese nobleman. He is designated as a member of the New Thirty-six Poetry Immortals. Hideyoshi served as Naidaijin.

External links 
E-text of his poems in Japanese

Fujiwara clan
1184 births
1240 deaths
12th-century Japanese poets
13th-century Japanese poets